

Playing career
Albert Alfred Brown (7 January 1862 – 1930), Brown was a footballer in the early years of English professional football, who played for Aston Villa from 1884 until 1894. Albert and his brother Alfred played in the same forward line during the 1884-1885 and 1885 - 1886 seasons. He was in the Villa team which won the FA Cup in 1887, beating local rivals West Bromwich Albion in the final. Before playing for Villa he played for Mitchell St George's.

Season 1888-89
Albert Brown was one of the 11 players who played in Aston Villa' opening League game. He played on the right wing at Dudley Road, Wolverhampton, then home of Wolverhampton Wanderers, known as the "Wolves". The match was drawn 1-1. Aston Villa and Wolves were great rivals that season with Villa finishing 2nd and Wolves 3rd and only 3 points separated the 2 teams. Albert Brown' debut League goal was on 15 September 1888 at Wellington Road, in a 5–1 win over Stoke. Albert Brown was one of three players to play in every match for Villa that season, 22 League games and 3 FA Cup ties. As a winger Albert Brown played in a midfield that achieved a big (three-or-more-League-goals) win on four occasions. He scored 7 League goals and 1 in the FA Cup. He also scored 2 in a match against Accrington at Wellington Road, Birmingham, the then home of Aston Villa. Aston Villa won 4–2.

He retired from the game because of injury.

His brother Arthur Alfred Brown also played for Villa and made three appearances for England.

Statistics
Source:

References

Arthur Brown AVFC Bio

1862 births
1930 deaths
Footballers from Birmingham, West Midlands
English footballers
Association football forwards
Birmingham St George's F.C. players
Aston Villa F.C. players
English Football League players
FA Cup Final players